John Henry Dixon (born 3 March 1954) is an English former first-class cricketer active from 1973 to 1988 who played for Gloucestershire, Oxford University and Wiltshire. He was born in Bournemouth. He appeared in 16 first-class matches as a right-handed batsman who bowled right arm medium-fast pace. He scored 77 runs with a highest score of 13* and held six catches. He took 21 wickets with a best analysis of five for 44. He was one of the bowlers during the then world record partnership for the second wicket between Warwickshire's Rohan Kanhai and John Jameson at Edgbaston in 1974. Dixon is the great-nephew of Gee Langdon and became a publisher and author.

Between 1984 and 1992 he was the publisher of The Cricket Diary, which included, amongst much other cricket information and records, weekly quotations, illustrations and most well-known cricketers' birthdays. His First Peel The Otter, a spoof cookery book, contained unfeasible recipes of a surreal, whimsical or gruesome nature. He subsequently contributed to The Marmite Cookbook and The Bumper Book of Marmite. Playwright Dougie Blaxland cites him as a major influence.

He plays bass guitar in The Disintegraters with, amongst others, Henry Marsh of the band Sailor, Stuart Ryan  and Stephen (Austin) Clark.

References

External links

1954 births
English cricketers
Gloucestershire cricketers
Oxford University cricketers
Wiltshire cricketers
Living people
Sportspeople from Bournemouth
Cricketers from Dorset